Trypanaresta coelestina is a species of tephritid or fruit flies in the genus Trypanaresta of the family Tephritidae.

Distribution
Brazil.

References

Tephritinae
Insects described in 1938
Diptera of South America